The 1980 Pontins Professional was the seventh edition of the professional invitational snooker tournament which took place between 3 and 10 May 1980 in Prestatyn, Wales.

The tournament featured eight professional players. The quarter-final matches were contested over the best of 7 frames, the semi-final matches over the best of 9 frames, and the final over the best of 17 frames.

John Virgo won the event, beating Ray Reardon 9–6 in the final.

Main draw

References

Pontins Professional
Snooker competitions in Wales
Pontins Professional
Pontins Professional
Pontins Professional